Huddersfield Atalanta Ladies Football Club was a women's football club in Huddersfield, West Yorkshire, England, from 1920 to about 1925. It took its name from Atalanta, the fierce huntress of Greek mythology.

Players 
Constance Waller was a founder member and secretary of the club, as well as the first woman reporter on a provincial newspaper, The Examiner of Huddersfield. Ethel Lee played as a goalkeepter, Lily Barraclough as captain and fullback alongside Hilda Clarke with Lily Mitchell as an outside half and Rhoda Wilkinson in outside-right. Miss H Broadhead was a goal scorer in a match against Bath Ladies at Leeds Road on Good Friday, March 25, 1921, in front of a crowd of 15,246 who turned up to see the team win 1–0.

Commemoration 
Its story forms the basis of the play Atalanta Forever by Amanda Whittington, commissioned by the Mikron Theatre Company for its 2020 season, delayed by the COVID-19, and produced in 2021.

Huddersfield Town Women F.C. was formed in 1988 as Huddersfield Town Ladies F.C.

References

Defunct women's football clubs in England
Defunct football clubs in West Yorkshire
Sports clubs in Huddersfield